Spam musubi is a snack and lunch food composed of a slice of grilled Spam sandwiched either in between or on top of a block of rice, wrapped together with nori in the tradition of Japanese onigiri.

Inexpensive and portable, Spam musubi are commonly found near cash registers in convenience stores or mom-and-pop shops all over Hawaii, Guam and Hawaiian Barbecue restaurants in the mainland United States.  Musubi can be easily made with the right materials, and typically only uses spam, rice, some salt, nori and shoyu (soy sauce). In Hawaii, musubi made from homemade spam is served on catering trays at formal events by celebrity chefs such as Alan Wong at his exclusive restaurants.

History
Spam musubi is a derivative of musubi, which originally came to Hawaii from Japan. It was a popular item among the lunchboxes of Hawaiian plantation workers.

The origin of Spam musubi is disputed. Survivors of the Japanese American internment camps on the mainland of the United States claim to have invented the precursor to Spam musubi, when they placed seasoned slices of Spam on white rice in a baking pan. However, most origin stories focus on Spam's ubiquity in Hawaii during and in the aftermath of World War II. With few other options, the canned meat was incorporated into local cuisines wherever American troops were stationed. For example, South Korea's budae-jjigae, a stew of surplus U.S. military foods, included Spam. In the United Kingdom, where Spam was ubiquitous during the hardship of the post-War years, Spam acquired a stigma exemplified by the 1970 Monty Python sketch. Spam may not have been abandoned in the Pacific like it was in the U.K. simply because of the comparative economic deprivation experienced in the Pacific region. 

The Honolulu Star-Bulletin stated in 2002 that "There is no definitive history for this aberration." Still, the newspaper relayed that a 2001 cookbook stated that the potential creator is Mitsuko Kaneshiro, who began selling them out of City Pharmacy on Pensacola Street in Honolulu and by the early 1980s was selling 500 handmade Spam musubi a day out of her own shop, Michan's Musubi. The other person said to be the creator of Spam musubi is Barbara Funamura of Kauai. Funamura sold Spam musubi out of the Joni-Hana restaurant in the Kukui Grove Center. The Garden Island in 1983 described it as, "Spam and rice, two local favorites, are combined in an enormous musubi (rice ball) wrapped in nori (sheets of dried seaweed)," with Funamura quoted, "That's the Spam musubi." Eventually Funamura's musubi was made using a box mold, taking on its familiar form.

In 1999, L&L Hawaiian Barbecue introduced the Hawaii regional snack as a menu item in its first mainland U.S. restaurant in Puente Hills, California. As the Hawaii-based chain grew across several American states, so did the awareness and popularity of the snack, eventually becoming a mainstay on the menu, and making L&L the first restaurant chain to make the snack available nationally.

On August 8, 2021, L&L Hawaiian Barbecue established "National Spam Musubi Day" to celebrate the iconic snack from Hawaii. The holiday was officially recognized by Hawaii Governor David Y. Ige. with a public proclamation.

Preparation 
Typical preparation begins with grilling or frying slices of Spam, sometimes with a light teriyaki flavor. It uses a sauce in which soy sauce and granulated sugar are typically the basic ingredients. Using a mold the same size as a slice of Spam, a layer of cooked rice is pressed down over a strip of nori, with a slice of Spam on top of that, and then, optionally, another layer of rice. The mold is removed and the nori is wrapped over the top and around the musubi. It is served sometimes with soy sauce or Japanese mayonnaise. Guam's Pacific Daily News describes the local version: "a slice of Spam is bathed in teriyaki sauce before topping a mound of rice with a dash of furikake and wrapped in a strip of nori." Another Guam recipe calls for Sriracha mayonnaise.

See also 

 
 , another Hawaiian dish that can involve rice and Spam
 , the original musubi

References

External links 
 
 
 
  
  (cited in previous link)

Hawaiian cuisine
Guamanian cuisine
Palauan cuisine
Spam dishes
Japanese-American cuisine
Hawaii culture